KHDY (1350 AM) is a radio station broadcasting a Classic Country music format. Licensed to Clarksville, Texas, United States, the station serves the Paris, Texas, area. The station is owned by American Media Investments and features programming from Jones Radio Network.

References

External links

HDY (AM)
Classic country radio stations in the United States